Senator Lawson may refer to:

Al Lawson (born 1948), Florida State Senate
Connie Lawson (born 1949), Indiana State Senate
David G. Lawson (born 1946), Delaware State Senate
Iver Lawson (publisher) (1821–1871), Illinois State Senate
John W. Lawson (1837–1905), Virginia State Senate
Robert R. Lawson (1872–1934), New York State Senate

See also
Senator Larson (disambiguation)